

29001–29100 

|-id=053
| 29053 Muskau || 4466 T-2 || Park von Muskau, astride the Neisse River between Poland and Germany || 
|-id=080
| 29080 Astrocourier || 1978 RK || The Eurasian Astronomical Society (EAAS), which was founded in 1990. It comprises professional astronomers from the former Soviet republics, Europe, Israel and the United States. || 
|-id=081
| 29081 Krymradio ||  || The "Crimean radio", on the occasion of the 80th anniversary. It broadcasts in seven languages. The naming also honors its tireless employees, high-quality experts, winners of international prizes and competitions of journalistic skill || 
|-id=085
| 29085 Sethanne || 1979 SD || Sethanne Howard (born 1944), American astronomer, chief of the U.S. Nautical Almanac Office 2000–2003  || 
|}

29101–29200 

|-id=122
| 29122 Vasadze ||  || Tariel Vasadze (born 1947), Ukrainian automotive inventor || 
|-id=125
| 29125 Kyivphysfak ||  || "Kyiv physics faculty" of the Kyiv National Taras Shevchenko University || 
|-id=132
| 29132 Bradpitt ||  || Brad Pitt (born 1963), American actor || 
|-id=133
| 29133 Vargas ||  || Norman ("Norm") L. Vargas (born 1972), American amateur astronomer who assisted in organizing the photographic glass plate archive of the 1.2-m Schmidt Oschin Telescope at Palomar Observatory || 
|-id=137
| 29137 Alanboss ||  || Alan Boss, American astrophysicist || 
|-id=146
| 29146 McHone || 1988 FN || John F. McHone (born 1944), American geologist, oceanographer and planetary scientist || 
|-id=148
| 29148 Palzer || 1988 JE || Wolfgang Palzer, German astronomer || 
|-id=157
| 29157 Higashinihon ||  || "Higashi Nihon" (East Japan) was struck by one of the most destructive earthquakes in history on 2011 Mar. 11. The whole nation has risen to the task of reconstruction with the spirit of "Ganbarou" ("do your best and don't give up"). || 
|-id=160
| 29160 São Paulo ||  || São Paulo is a city located in south-eastern Brazil. It was founded as a small village in 1554 by Jesuits, and became the capital of the province in 1681. Prior to arrival of the Portuguese, the area was occupied by the Tupi people. || 
|-id=185
| 29185 Reich ||  || Ludwig Reich (born 1940), Austrian professor of mathematics at the Karl-Franzens-Universität Graz (University of Graz), editor of several international mathematical journals, and a member of the Österreichische Akademie der Wissenschaften (Austrian Academy of Sciences) || 
|-id=186
| 29186 Lake Tekapo ||  || Lake Tekapo, located near the Southern Alps on New Zealand's South Island, is known for its breath-taking scenery. It is home to Canterbury University's Mt John Observatory and is a major centre for astro-tourism || 
|-id=187
| 29187 Lemonnier ||  || Charles-Pierre Lemonnier (1675–1757), French astronomer || 
|-id=189
| 29189 Udinsk ||  || Udinsk (Ulan-Ude), capital of the Buryat Republic of Siberia || 
|-id=193
| 29193 Dolphyn ||  || Willem Dolphyn (1935–2016), a Flemish painter and illustrator, and the son of realistic painter and portrait artist Victor Dolphyn † || 
|-id=196
| 29196 Dius || 1990 YY || Dius was the brother of Hektor and Paris, sons of Priamus, the king of Troy during the Trojan War. || 
|-id=197
| 29197 Gleim ||  || Johann Wilhelm Ludwig Gleim (1719–1803), German poet, nicknamed "Father Gleim" for his patronage || 
|-id=198
| 29198 Weathers || 1991 DW || Del Weathers (1951–2003), American engineering and design team leader for Space Station Freedom || 
|-id=199
| 29199 Himeji || 1991 FZ || Himeji Castle is the symbol of the city and both Japan's national treasure and a World Heritage site. It was also the hometown of Hideo Hirose, former director of Tokyo Astronomical Observatory || 
|}

29201–29300 

|-id=203
| 29203 Schnitger ||  || Arp Schnitger (1648–1719), German organ builder || 
|-id=204
| 29204 Ladegast ||  || Friedrich Ladegast (1818–1905), German organ builder || 
|-id=208
| 29208 Halorentz ||  || Hendrik Lorentz (1853–1928), Dutch physicist and Nobelist || 
|-id=210
| 29210 Robertbrown ||  || Robert Brown (1773–1858) was a Scottish botanist who made important contributions to botany largely through his pioneering use of the microscope. In 1827, while examining grains of pollen from the plant Clarka Pulchella in water under a microscope, he discovered Brownian motion. || 
|-id=212
| 29212 Zeeman ||  || Pieter Zeeman (1865–1943), Dutch physicist and Nobelist ‡ ||  
|-id=214
| 29214 Apitzsch ||  || Rolf Apitzsch (born 1943) is a German amateur astronomer and discoverer of minor planets at his Wildberg observatory. || 
|-id=220
| 29220 Xavierbaptista ||  || Francisco Xavier Baptista (1730–1797) was a Portuguese composer from Lisbon where he was the first organist at the Cathedral of St. Mary. He wrote many harpsichord sonatas, toccatas and minuets that can also be played easily on the organ. || 
|-id=227
| 29227 Wegener ||  || Alfred Wegener (1880–1930), German geophysicist, and creator of the theory of continental drift || 
|-id=244
| 29244 Van Damme ||  || Jozef Van Damme (1912–), Dutch teacher and literary historian || 
|-id=246
| 29246 Clausius || 1992 RV || Rudolf Clausius (1822–1888), German physicist and mathematician || 
|-id=249
| 29249 Hiraizumi ||  || Hiraizumi, a Japanese town in Iwate prefecture, which reached the height of its prosperity during the twelfth century as the home of the Fujiwara family in Oshu province. The Golden Hall (Konjikido) of Chusonji and the ruins of Motsuji temple are reminiscent of its glory || 
|-id=250
| 29250 Helmutmoritz ||  || Helmut Moritz (born 1933) is the most prominent Austrian professor of physical geodesy, a member of the Austrian Academy of Sciences and of many other international academies and societies. Moritz published more than 200 important papers and books on the gravitational field and the rotation of the earth || 
|-id=252
| 29252 Konjikido ||  || Konjikido, the Golden Hall of Chusonji Temple in Iwate prefecture, was built in 1124 by Fujiwara Kiyohira. It is typical Heian period Amida hall architecture and covered with gold throughout. The coffins of the three successive heads of the Northern Fujiwara family who ruled the region are stored under the altars || 
|-id=292
| 29292 Conniewalker ||  || Connie Walker (born 1957), American astronomer || 
|-id=298
| 29298 Cruls ||  || Luis Cruls (1848–1908), a Belgian-born Brazilian astronomer and geodesist. || 
|}

29301–29400 

|-id=307
| 29307 Torbernbergman ||  || Swedish chemist and mineralogist Torbern Olof Bergman (1735–1784) developed a mineral classification scheme based on chemical characteristics and appearance. His Dissertation on Elective Attractions (1775) contains the largest chemical affinity table ever published || 
|-id=311
| 29311 Lesire ||  || Though suffering severely from hardness of hearing from an early age and moving from one school to another, Louise Lesire (born 1990) managed by extreme perseverance and help from her parents and teachers to finish high school successfully. She plans now to proceed with kinesitherapy in Ghent || 
|-id=314
| 29314 Eurydamas ||  || Eurydamas, a Trojan priest and an interpreter of dreams || 
|-id=328
| 29328 Hanshintigers ||  || Hanshin Tigers, Japanese baseball club || 
|-id=329
| 29329 Knobelsdorff ||  || Georg Wenzeslaus von Knobelsdorff, German painter and architect || 
|-id=337
| 29337 Hakurojo ||  || Himeji Castle, in Hyogo prefecture, is Japan's National Treasure, also known as Hakurojo or White Heron Castle, because of its beauty and likeness to a white heron. This symbol of Himeji City was registered as a World Cultural Heritage site, the first in Japan, in Dec. 1993 || 
|-id=345
| 29345 Ivandanilov ||  || Ivan Vasil'evich Danilov (1952–1998), Russian bell-ringer || 
|-id=346
| 29346 Mariadina ||  || Maria Dina Mannozzi, Italian midwife in Montelupo || 
|-id=347
| 29347 Natta || 1995 EU || Giulio Natta (1903–1979), an Italian academic chemist and winner of the Nobel prize for chemistry in 1963. || 
|-id=348
| 29348 Criswick || 1995 FD || John Criswick (born 1963), Canadian astronomy benefactor † || 
|-id=353
| 29353 Manu || 1995 OG || Manuela Vedovelli (born 1969), an Italian astronomer and friend of Andrea Boattini who co-discovered this minor planet. || 
|-id=355
| 29355 Siratakayama ||  || Siratakayama volcano, Yamagata prefecture, Japan || 
|-id=356
| 29356 Giovarduino ||  || Giovanni Arduino (1714–1795) was an Italian geologist, often described as the "Father of Italian Geology". || 
|-id=361
| 29361 Botticelli || 1996 CY || Sandro Botticelli (1445–1510), Italian painter || 
|-id=362
| 29362 Azumakofuzi ||  || Azumakofuzi, a 1707-meter mountain located in the Bandai-Asahi National Park, in the eastern part of the Azuma mountain range. || 
|-id=363
| 29363 Ghigabartolini ||  || Ludovica "Ghiga" Bartolini (born 2016) is the granddaughter of Italian amateur astronomer Maura Tombelli, who co-discovered this minor planet. || 
|-id=373
| 29373 Hamanowa ||  || Hiromi Hamanowa (born 1953), a Japanese amateur astronomer || 
|-id=374
| 29374 Kazumitsu ||  || Kazumitsu Date (1927–1953) became a science teacher of a junior high school in 1948, and taught astronomy not only to his pupils but also to other teachers. In 1951 he went on to Tokyo University with the hopes of becoming a professional astronomer. || 
|-id=391
| 29391 Knight || 1996 MB || Kent Knight (1920–1994) was a founding member and former president of the Fort Bend Astronomy Club in Texas. || 
|-id=394
| 29394 Hirokohamanowa ||  || Hiroko Hamanowa (born 1960), a Japanese amateur astronomer. || 
|}

29401–29500 

|-
| 29401 Asterix || 1996 TE || Astérix is a famous comic strip character by French artists Albert Uderzo and René Goscinny. || 
|-id=402
| 29402 Obelix ||  || Obélix is a famous comic strip character by French artists Albert Uderzo and René Goscinny. || 
|-id=404
| 29404 Hikarusato ||  || Hikaru Sato (born 1951) is a Japanese amateur astronomer, observer of minor-planet occultations, and secretary general of the Fukushima Astronomical Society. || 
|-id=419
| 29419 Mládková ||  || Meda Mládková (born 1919), a Czech art historian and benefactor. || 
|-id=420
| 29420 Ikuo ||  || Ikuo Sato, the discoverer's brother || 
|-id=427
| 29427 Oswaldthomas ||  || Oswald Thomas (1882–1963) was an Austrian astronomer and popularizer of astronomy, who founded the Astronomical Bureau and Astronomical Society in Vienna || 
|-id=428
| 29428 Ettoremajorana ||  || Ettore Majorana, Italian theoretical physicist. || 
|-id=430
| 29430 Mimiyen ||  || Mimi Yen (born 1994) is a finalist in the 2012 Intel Science Talent Search, a science competition for high-school seniors, for her animal-sciences project. || 
|-id=431
| 29431 Shijimi ||  || Shijimi is a popular clam in Japan. The name was proposed by children who attended the Fureai Space Festival 2002, held in Matsue on Space Day in Japan. || 
|-id=432
| 29432 Williamscott ||  || William Scott mentored a finalist in the 2012 Intel Science Talent Search, a science competition for high-school seniors. || 
|-id=435
| 29435 Mordell ||  || Louis Joel Mordell, American-British mathematician || 
|-id=437
| 29437 Marchais ||  || Denis Marchais, French amateur astronomer || 
|-id=438
| 29438 Zhengjia || 1997 MV || The Zhengjia museums are located in Guangzhou, southern China. Dedicated to science education, the museums started educational astronomy programs with the National Astronomical Observatories operated by the Chinese Academy of Sciences. || 
|-id=439
| 29439 Maxfabiani ||  || Maximilian Fabiani (1865–1962), commonly known as Max Fabiani, was a central European architect and urban planner of mixed Italian-Austrian ancestry. He designed remarkable buildings in Vienna, Ljubljana, Trieste and Gorizia. || 
|-id=443
| 29443 Remocorti ||  || Remo Corti, Italian amateur astronomer and telescope maker || 
|-id=446
| 29446 Gouguenheim || 1997 PX || Lucienne Gouguenheim (born 1935) is a French radio astronomer at Meudon Observatory, who taught at Orsay University from 1962 to 2005. Observing the 21-cm line of galaxies, she helped reconcile the then-divergent values of the Hubble constant. She is a founding member of the Comité de Liaison Enseignants et Astronomes || 
|-id=447
| 29447 Jerzyneyman ||  || Jerzy Neyman, Poland-born American mathematician || 
|-id=448
| 29448 Pappos || 1997 QJ || Pappos of Alexandria, Greek mathematician || 
|-id=449
| 29449 Taharbenjelloun ||  || Tahar Ben Jelloun (born 1944) is a Moroccan writer, poet and essayist, who writes exclusively in French. || 
|-id=450
| 29450 Tomohiroohno ||  || Tomohiro Ohno (born 1983) is the sub-director of Hoshinomura Observatory in Fukushima prefecture in Japan. With his father, the director of the Hoshinomura Observatory, he observes the universe and contributes to the popularization of astronomy by frequent NHK television and radio appearances || 
|-id=456
| 29456 Evakrchová ||  || Eva Krchová, Slovak amateur astronomer || 
|-id=457
| 29457 Marcopolo ||  || Marco Polo, Venetian explorer || 
|-id=458
| 29458 Pearson ||  || Karl Pearson, British mathematician || 
|-id=463
| 29463 Benjaminpeirce ||  || Benjamin Peirce, American mathematician || 
|-id=464
| 29464 Leonmiš ||  || Leon Miš, Czech amateur astronomer † || 
|-id=467
| 29467 Shandongdaxue ||  || Shandong University, China || 
|-id=470
| 29470 Higgs ||  || Peter Higgs, Scottish physicist. || 
|-id=471
| 29471 Spejbl ||  || Spejbl, a marionette, father of Hurvínek † || 
|-id=472
| 29472 Hurvínek ||  || Hurvínek, a mischievous marionette, son of Spejbl † || 
|-id=473
| 29473 Krejčí ||  || František Krejčí, founder of the popular observatory in Karlovy Vary in the Czech Republic † || 
|-id=476
| 29476 Kvíčala ||  || Jan Kvíčala, Czech lawyer and amateur astronomer † || 
|-id=477
| 29477 Zdíkšíma ||  || Zdislav Šíma, Czech astronomer † ‡ || 
|-id=483
| 29483 Boeker ||  || Karolin Kleemann-Boeker (born 1966) and Andreas Boeker (1964–2011), longtime German amateur astronomers, interested in astrometry and astrophotography, and cofounders of Turtle Star Observatory. Boeker was also experienced in building observatories and constructing telescope mounts || 
|-id=484
| 29484 Honzaveselý ||  || Jan Veselý, Czech cyclist † || 
|-id=490
| 29490 Myslbek || 1997 WX || Josef Václav Myslbek, Czech sculptor † || 
|-id=491
| 29491 Pfaff ||  || Jean-Marie Pfaff, Belgian football player † || 
|}

29501–29600 

|-id=508
| 29508 Bottinelli ||  || Lucette Bottinelli (1937–2015) was a French radio astronomer from Meudon Observatory, who taught at Orsay University from 1962 to 2005. || 
|-id=514
| 29514 Karatsu ||  || Karatsu, a city in Saga Prefecture on the island of Kyushu, Japan. || 
|-id=528
| 29528 Kaplinski ||  || Jaan Kaplinski (1941–2021) was an Estonian writer, philosopher, and culture critic. He published numerous collections of poems, prose and essays. He was also an amateur astronomer and wrote a popular astronomy book || 
|-id=547
| 29547 Yurimazzanti ||  || Yuri Mazzanti (born 1999) has been an observer since he was young. He has been an active member of the Gruppo Astrofili Montelupo for the last 10 years, and has been involved in both research and outreach. . || 
|-id=552
| 29552 Chern ||  || Shiing-shen Chern, Chinese-American mathematician and educator || 
|-id=555
| 29555 MACEK || 1998 DP || MACEK, Czech micro-accelerometer satellite instrument || 
|-id=561
| 29561 Iatteri ||  || Giampiero Iatteri, Italian amateur astronomer || 
|-id=562
| 29562 Danmacdonald ||  || Daniel R. MacDonald, American astrophysicist || 
|-id=565
| 29565 Glenngould || 1998 FD || Glenn Gould, Canadian pianist † || 
|-id=568
| 29568 Gobbi-Belcredi ||  || Gerolamo Gobbi-Belcredi (1820–1899) was a student at the astronomical observatory of Modena during 1841–1848. He observed comets and minor planets and calculated their orbits. He became professor of physics at the University of Genoa and Parma and later professor of geodesy at the University of Pavia || 
|-id=575
| 29575 Gundlapalli ||  || Prithvi Gundlapalli (born 1995) was awarded second place in the 2013 Intel International Science and Engineering Fair for his chemistry project. || 
|-id=585
| 29585 Johnhale ||  || John Edward Hale (born 1995) was awarded first place in the 2013 Intel International Science and Engineering Fair for his environmental management team project. || 
|}

29601–29700 

|-id=605
| 29605 Joshuacolwell ||  || Joshua Colwell (born 1964) is a Pegasus Professor of Physics at the University of Central Florida (Orlando, Florida) whose studies include the structure and dynamics of Saturn's rings, the behavior of materials in microgravity, and the electrostatic charging of lunar and asteroid regoliths. || 
|-id=607
| 29607 Jakehecla ||  || Jake Jordan Hecla (born 1994) was awarded second place in the 2013 Intel International Science and Engineering Fair for his physics and astronomy team project. || 
|-id=609
| 29609 Claudiahuang ||  || Claudia Huang (born 1996) was awarded second place in the 2013 Intel International Science and Engineering Fair for her chemistry project. || 
|-id=610
| 29610 Iyengar ||  || Vinay Sridhar Iyengar (born 1996) was awarded best of category and first place in the 2013 Intel International Science and Engineering Fair for his mathematical sciences project. || 
|-id=612
| 29612 Cindyjiang ||  || Cindy Y. Jiang (born 1995) was awarded second place in the 2013 Intel International Science and Engineering Fair for her environmental sciences project. || 
|-id=613
| 29613 Charlespicard ||  || Charles Émile Picard, French mathematician and educator || 
|-id=614
| 29614 Sheller ||  || William Sheller (born 1949) is a French composer, singer and pianist. He studied classical music but after listening to the Beatles decided he would play rock and roll. He has since found great success in France and has composed and interpreted progressive rock as well as symphonic rock || 
|-id=618
| 29618 Jinandrew ||  || Andrew Cheng Jin (born 1997) was awarded second place in the 2013 Intel International Science and Engineering Fair for his medicine and health sciences project. || 
|-id=619
| 29619 Kapurubandage ||  || Kapurubandage Dinesh Anuruddha Chithrananda Kapuge Pubudu (born 1994) was awarded first place in the 2013 Intel International Science and Engineering Fair for his electrical and mechanical engineering project. || 
|-id=620
| 29620 Gurbanikaur ||  || Gurbani Kaur (born 1995) was awarded second place in the 2013 Intel International Science and Engineering Fair for her materials and bioengineering project. || 
|-id=624
| 29624 Sugiyama || 1998 TA || Tomiei Sugiyama (born 1949), a Japanese-American baseball team supervisor || 
|-id=628
| 29628 Fedorets ||  || Grigori Fedorets (born 1986) is a postdoctoral researcher at the Queen's University Belfast (Northern Ireland) whose contributions include asteroid orbit computation in the Gaia mission and simulations of minimoon discoverability with the Large Synoptic Survey Telescope. || 
|-id=631
| 29631 Ryankenny ||  || Ryan M. Kenny (born 1996) was awarded best of category and first place in the 2013 Intel International Science and Engineering Fair for his plant sciences team project. || 
|-id=633
| 29633 Weatherwax ||  || Craig (born 1947) and Leigh (born 1947) Weatherwax have helped the astronomy community in southern California for more than 40 years. They are good friends of the discoverer and this naming is on the occasion of their retirement. || 
|-id=634
| 29634 Sabrinaaksil ||  || Sabrina Aksil (born 1985) is the wife of French amateur astronomer Luderic Maury (see ) and the daughter-in-law of Alain Maury, who is a discoverer of minor planets and comets (see ). She works as a human resources manager in a high tech company. || 
|-id=638
| 29638 Eeshakhare ||  || Eesha Khare (born 1995) was awarded best of category and first place in the 2013 Intel International Science and Engineering Fair for her chemistry project. She also received the Intel Foundation Young Scientist Award. || 
|-id=641
| 29641 Kaikloepfer ||  || Kai Thorin Kloepfer (born 1997) was awarded first place in the 2013 Intel International Science and Engineering Fair for his electrical and mechanical engineering project. || 
|-id=642
| 29642 Archiekong ||  || Archie Chakming Kong (born 1996) was awarded second place in the 2013 Intel International Science and Engineering Fair for his environmental management team project. || 
|-id=643
| 29643 Plücker ||  || Julius Plücker, German mathematician and physicist || 
|-id=645
| 29645 Kutsenok ||  || Ekaterina Kutsenok (born 1997) was awarded second place in the 2013 Intel International Science and Engineering Fair for her chemistry team project. || 
|-id=646
| 29646 Polya || 1998 WJ || George Pólya, Hungarian-born American mathematician † || 
|-id=647
| 29647 Poncelet || 1998 WY || Jean-Victor Poncelet, French mathematician and engineer || 
|-id=650
| 29650 Toldy ||  || Mikulás Toldy (1926–1996) and Viera Toldy (1926–1995), Slovak obstetrician and pediatrician, respectively || 
|-id=654
| 29654 Michaellaue ||  || Michael Laue (born 1995) was awarded second place in the 2013 Intel International Science and Engineering Fair for his chemistry project. || 
|-id=655
| 29655 Yarimlee ||  || Yarim Lee (born 1997) was awarded second place in the 2013 Intel International Science and Engineering Fair for her biochemistry project. || 
|-id=656
| 29656 Leejoseph ||  || Joseph Patrick Lee (born 1997) was awarded second place in the 2013 Intel International Science and Engineering Fair for his physics and astronomy project. || 
|-id=657
| 29657 Andreali ||  || Andrea Shao-yin Li (born 1996) was awarded first place in the 2013 Intel International Science and Engineering Fair for her biochemistry project. || 
|-id=658
| 29658 Henrylin ||  || Henry Wanjune Lin (born 1995) was awarded best of category and first place in the 2013 Intel International Science and Engineering Fair for his physics and astronomy project. || 
|-id=659
| 29659 Zeyuliu ||  || Zeyu Liu (born 1995) was awarded best of category and first place in the 2013 Intel International Science and Engineering Fair for his electrical and mechanical engineering project. || 
|-id=660
| 29660 Jessmacalpine ||  || Jessie Leanne Preston MacAlpine (born 1995) was awarded best of category and first place in the 2013 Intel International Science and Engineering Fair for her medicine and health sciences project. || 
|-id=663
| 29663 Evanmackay ||  || Evan Cliff MacKay (born 1996) was awarded second place in the 2013 Intel International Science and Engineering Fair for his animal sciences project. || 
|-id=668
| 29668 Ipf || 1998 XO || The Ipf is a treeless mountain near the Ries impact crater in Baden-Württemberg, southern Germany. || 
|-id=672
| 29672 Salvo ||  || Maria Elena Salvo, Italian astronomer † || 
|-id=674
| 29674 Raušal ||  || Karel Raušal, Czech lawyer and amateur astronomer † || 
|-id=681
| 29681 Saramanshad ||  || Sara Manshad (born 1998) was awarded second place in the 2013 Intel International Science and Engineering Fair for her behavioral and social sciences project. || 
|-id=685
| 29685 Soibamansoor ||  || Soiba K. Mansoor (born 1996) was awarded second place in the 2013 Intel International Science and Engineering Fair for her medicine and health sciences project. || 
|-id=686
| 29686 Raymondmaung ||  || Raymond Aung Maung (born 1995) was awarded second place in the 2013 Intel International Science and Engineering Fair for his physics and astronomy team project. || 
|-id=687
| 29687 Mohdreza ||  || Nurul MohdReza (born 1996) was awarded second place in the 2013 Intel International Science and Engineering Fair for her microbiology project. || 
|-id=690
| 29690 Nistala ||  || Akhil Nistala (born 1995) was awarded second place in the 2013 Intel International Science and Engineering Fair for his mathematical sciences project. || 
|-id=696
| 29696 Distasio || 1998 YN || Penny Distasio (born 1955) is an amateur astronomer and author. She ran the OPTAS astronomy club for 15 years and is now a content writer for many web sites related to astronomy. || 
|-id=700
| 29700 Salmon ||  || George Salmon, Irish mathematician and theologian || 
|}

29701–29800 

|-
| 29701 Peggyhaas ||  || Peggy Haas (née Beryl Godfrey; 1912–1997) was an assistant to American astronomer William Henry Pickering in Jamaica. There she met and later married Walter Haas who in 1947, started the Association of Lunar and Planetary Observers (ALPO). She was indispensable to the ALPO in work on the Journal, as librarian from 1966 to 1985. || 
|-id=705
| 29705 Cialucy ||  || Lucia Boattini (born 1958), elder sister of Andrea Boattini † || 
|-id=706
| 29706 Simonetta ||  || Simonetta Boattini (born 1972), younger sister of Andrea Boattini † || 
|-id=725
| 29725 Mikewest ||  || Michael West (born 1954) has served amateur astronomers for more than 30 years with his expertise, advice, encouragement and unwavering commitment to the astronomical community. || 
|-id=736
| 29736 Fichtelberg ||  || Fichtelberg, the highest mountain on the Saxon side of the Erzgebirge, Germany || 
|-id=737
| 29737 Norihiro ||  || Norihiro Nakamura, Japanese baseball player || 
|-id=738
| 29738 Ivobudil ||  || Ivo Budil (born 1933), a Czech science popularizer || 
|-id=745
| 29745 Mareknovak ||  || Marek Novak (born 1994) was awarded second place in the 2013 Intel International Science and Engineering Fair for his electrical and mechanical engineering project. || 
|-id=747
| 29747 Acorlando ||  || Abigail Claire Orlando (born 1994) was awarded first place in the 2013 Intel International Science and Engineering Fair for her behavioral and social sciences project. || 
|-id=750
| 29750 Chleborad ||  || Cary W. Chleborad (born 1970) is an American amateur astronomer, developer of precision telescope and observatory control software, and former president of the Sacramento Valley Astronomical Society. || 
|-id=753
| 29753 Silvo ||  || Silvo Sposetti, son of Swiss discoverer Stefano Sposetti || 
|-id=760
| 29760 Milevsko ||  || Milevsko, a small South Bohemian town founded in the 12th century at the crossroad of two trade routes. || 
|-id=761
| 29761 Lorenzo ||  || Lorenzo Bartolini (born 2011) is the elder son of the second discoverer and the grandson of the first discoverer, Sandro Bartolini and Maura Tombelli, respectively. || 
|-id=762
| 29762 Panasiewicz ||  || Kinga Panasiewicz (born 1995) was awarded second place in the 2013 Intel International Science and Engineering Fair for her medicine and health sciences project. || 
|-id=764
| 29764 Panneerselvam ||  || Sugirtha Panneerselvam (born 1996) was awarded second place in the 2013 Intel International Science and Engineering Fair for her environmental management project. || 
|-id=765
| 29765 Miparedes ||  || Miguel Ignacio Paredes (born 1994) was awarded second place in the 2013 Intel International Science and Engineering Fair for his behavioral and social sciences project. || 
|-id=770
| 29770 Timmpiper ||  || Timm Piper (born 1995) was awarded second place in the 2013 Intel International Science and Engineering Fair for his physics and astronomy project. || 
|-id=772
| 29772 Portocarrero ||  || Isaac Christopher Portocarrero-Mora (born 1994) was awarded second place in the 2013 Intel International Science and Engineering Fair for his electrical and mechanical engineering project. || 
|-id=773
| 29773 Samuelpritt ||  || Samuel Wye Pritt (born 1995) was awarded second place in the 2013 Intel International Science and Engineering Fair for his biochemistry project. || 
|-id=776
| 29776 Radzhabov ||  || Maxim Ruslanovich Radzhabov (born 1997) was awarded second place in the 2013 Intel International Science and Engineering Fair for his chemistry team project.  || 
|-id=783
| 29783 Sanjanarane ||  || Sanjana Jagdish Rane (born 1997) was awarded second place in the 2013 Intel International Science and Engineering Fair for her environmental sciences project. || 
|-id=787
| 29787 Timrenier ||  || Timothy James Fossum Renier (born 1997) was awarded second place in the 2013 Intel International Science and Engineering Fair for his behavioral and social sciences project. || 
|-id=788
| 29788 Rachelrossi ||  || Rachel Louise Rossi (born 1995) was awarded second place in the 2013 Intel International Science and Engineering Fair for her environmental management project. || 
|-id=799
| 29799 Trinirussell ||  || Trinity Russell (born 1995) was awarded second place in the 2013 Intel International Science and Engineering Fair for her animal sciences project. || 
|-id=800
| 29800 Valeriesarge ||  || Valerie Youngmi Sarge (born 1997) was awarded second place in the 2013 Intel International Science and Engineering Fair for her energy and transportation project. || 
|}

29801–29900 

|-id=802
| 29802 Rikhavshah ||  || Rikhav Shah (born 1997) was awarded second place in the 2013 Intel International Science and Engineering Fair for his environmental sciences project. || 
|-id=803
| 29803 Michaelshao ||  || Michael Shao (born 1997) was awarded best of category and first place in the 2013 Intel International Science and Engineering Fair for his animal sciences project. || 
|-id=804
| 29804 Idansharon ||  || Idan Hadar Sharon (born 1995) was awarded second place in the 2013 Intel International Science and Engineering Fair for his electrical and mechanical engineering team project. || 
|-id=805
| 29805 Bradleysloop ||  || Bradley Derek Sloop (born 1994) was awarded first place in the 2013 Intel International Science and Engineering Fair for his energy and transportation project. || 
|-id=806
| 29806 Eviesobczak ||  || Evie Sobczak (born 1996) was awarded best of category and first place in the 2013 Intel International Science and Engineering Fair for her energy and transportation project. || 
|-id=808
| 29808 Youssoliman ||  || Yousuf Mounir Soliman (born 1996) was awarded second place in the 2013 Intel International Science and Engineering Fair for his computer science project. || 
|-id=812
| 29812 Aaronsolomon ||  || Aaron Chu Solomon (born 1994) was awarded second place in the 2013 Intel International Science and Engineering Fair for his environmental management project. || 
|-id=818
| 29818 Aryosorayya ||  || Aryo Sorayya (born 1994) was awarded first place in the 2013 Intel International Science and Engineering Fair for his medicine and health sciences project. || 
|-id=824
| 29824 Kalmančok ||  || Dušan Kalmančok, Slovak astronomer || 
|-id=825
| 29825 Dunyazade ||  || Dunyazade, the sister of the master story-teller of the 1001 Arabian Nights. || 
|-id=829
| 29829 Engels ||  || Friedrich Engels (1820–1895), a famous philosopher and the main thinker of dialectical materialism. || 
|-id=832
| 29832 Steinwehr ||  || Dre Erik Howard Steinwehr (born 1995) was awarded first place in the 2013 Intel International Science and Engineering Fair for his plant sciences project. || 
|-id=834
| 29834 Mariacallas ||  || Maria Callas (1923–1977; Sophia Cecelia Kalos) was a Greek soprano. She was, and remains, the iconic diva, the one to which the others are compared. || 
|-id=837
| 29837 Savage ||  || Leonard Jimmie Savage (1917–1971), American statistician || 
|-id=839
| 29839 Russhoward ||  || Russell A. Howard (born 1941) is an astrophysicist at the US Naval Research Laboratory. A pioneer in solar physics, he has led several space-based coronagraph experiments enabling ground-breaking studies of solar outflows and returning data that yielded the discovery of nearly 4 000 near-Sun comets. || 
|-id=845
| 29845 Wykrota ||  || Zininha and Henrique Wykrota, Brazilian amateur astronomers, founders of the Observatório Wykrota (a.k.a. Observatório Astronômico da Serra da Piedade) and of the CEAMIG (Centro de Estudos Astronomicos de Minas Gerais) || 
|-id=850
| 29850 Tanakagyou ||  || Gyou Tanaka (born 1997) was awarded best of category and first place in the 2013 Intel International Science and Engineering Fair for his earth science project. || 
|-id=852
| 29852 Niralithakor ||  || Nirali Kunjan Thakor (born 1998) was awarded second place in the 2013 Intel International Science and Engineering Fair for her mathematical sciences team project. || 
|-id=858
| 29858 Tlomak ||  || Dominique Helen Tlomak (born 1996) was awarded second place in the 2013 Intel International Science and Engineering Fair for her medicine and health sciences project. || 
|-id=862
| 29862 Savannahjoy ||  || Savannah Joy Tobin (born 1994) was awarded best of category and first place in the 2013 Intel International Science and Engineering Fair for her biochemistry project. || 
|-id=869
| 29869 Chiarabarbara ||  || Chiara and Barbara D'Abramo, sisters of the Italian co-discoverer Germano D'Abramo || 
|-id=874
| 29874 Rogerculver ||  || Roger B. Culver (born 1940), a U.S. astronomer. || 
|-id=880
| 29880 Andytran ||  || Andy Tran (born 1995) was awarded first place in the 2013 Intel International Science and Engineering Fair for his medicine and health sciences project. || 
|-id=881
| 29881 Tschopp ||  || Fabian David Tschopp (born 1992) was awarded second place in the 2013 Intel International Science and Engineering Fair for his computer science project. || 
|-id=886
| 29886 Randytung ||  || Randy Tung (born 1996) was awarded second place in the 2013 Intel International Science and Engineering Fair for his environmental management team project. || 
|-id=897
| 29897 Kossen ||  || H. Rose Kossen (born 1935, née Hoitenga) is a retired teacher, formerly of Watson Groen Christian School. She taught high school literature, challenging students to think deeply about the world around them. || 
|}

29901–30000 

|-id=905
| 29905 Kunitaka ||  || Kunitaka Sato (born 1948) has been a member of the Yamagata Astronomical Society since 1989. || 
|-id=910
| 29910 Segre ||  || Corrado Segre, Italian professor of geometry || 
|-id=950
| 29950 Uppili ||  || Harsha Sudarsan Uppili (born 1996) was awarded second place in the 2013 Intel International Science and Engineering Fair for his materials and bioengineering project. || 
|-id=952
| 29952 Varghese ||  || Nathaniel G. Varghese (born 1997) was awarded second place in the 2013 Intel International Science and Engineering Fair for his materials and bioengineering project. || 
|-id=959
| 29959 Senevelling ||  || Seneca Jackson Velling (born 1996) was awarded second place in the 2013 Intel International Science and Engineering Fair for his physics and astronomy team project. || 
|-id=969
| 29969 Amyvitha ||  || Amy Jaclyn Vitha (born 1996) was awarded best of category and first place in the 2013 Intel International Science and Engineering Fair for her plant sciences team project. || 
|-id=972
| 29972 Chriswan ||  || Christopher Wan (born 1996) was awarded first place in the 2013 Intel International Science and Engineering Fair for his environmental sciences project. || 
|-id=978
| 29978 Arthurwang ||  || Arthur Wang (born 1996) was awarded second place in the 2013 Intel International Science and Engineering Fair for his environmental management team project. || 
|-id=979
| 29979 Wastyk ||  || Hannah Constance Wastyk (born 1995) was awarded best of category and first place in the 2013 Intel International Science and Engineering Fair for her cellular and molecular biology project. || 
|-id=980
| 29980 Dougsimons ||  || Douglas Anthony Simons, American astronomer || 
|-id=982
| 29982 Sarahwu ||  || Junyi (Sarah) Wu (born 1996) was awarded second place in the 2013 Intel International Science and Engineering Fair for her medicine and health sciences project. || 
|-id=983
| 29983 Amyxu ||  || Amy Xu (born 1996) was awarded second place in the 2013 Intel International Science and Engineering Fair for her microbiology project. || 
|-id=984
| 29984 Zefferer ||  || David Josef Zefferer (born 1992) was awarded second place in the 2013 Intel International Science and Engineering Fair for his energy and transportation team project. || 
|-id=986
| 29986 Shunsuke ||  || Shunsuke Nakamura, Japanese football (soccer) player || 
|-id=987
| 29987 Lazhang ||  || Lawrence Zhang (born 1996) was awarded second place in the 2013 Intel International Science and Engineering Fair for his cellular and molecular biology project. || 
|-id=988
| 29988 Davidezilli ||  || Davide Zilli (born 1993) was awarded second place in the 2013 Intel International Science and Engineering Fair for his energy and transportation team project. || 
|-id=991
| 29991 Dazimmerman ||  || David Masao Zimmerman (born 1994) was awarded best of category and first place in the 2013 Intel International Science and Engineering Fair for his microbiology project. || 
|-id=992
| 29992 Yasminezubi ||  || Yasmine Sapphire Zubi (born 1996) was awarded second place in the 2013 Intel International Science and Engineering Fair for her cellular and molecular biology project. She attends the Satellite High School, Satellite Beach, Florida, U.S.A || 
|-id=994
| 29994 Zuoyu ||  || Zuo Yu (born 1995) was awarded second place in the 2013 Intel International Science and Engineering Fair for her electrical and mechanical engineering team project. || 
|-id=995
| 29995 Arshavsky ||  || Alec Vadim Arshavsky (born 1996) is a finalist in the 2014 Intel Science Talent Search, a science competition for high school seniors, for his bioengineering project. || 
|-id=000
| 30000 Camenzind ||  || Kathy Camenzind (born 1996) is a finalist in the 2014 Intel Science Talent Search (STS), a science competition for high school seniors, for her physics project. || 
|}

References 

029001-030000